Wickham "Wick" James Powell (13 September 1892 – 20 March 1961) was a Welsh dual-code international rugby union, and professional rugby league footballer who played in the 1910s and 1920s. He played representative level rugby union (RU) for Wales, and at cub level for Cardiff RFC (captain), as a wing, i.e. number 11 or 14,, and representative level rugby league (RL) for the Other Nationalities, and at cub level for Rochdale Hornets.

International honours
Wick Powell won caps for Wales (RU) while at Cardiff RFC in 1920 against England, Scotland, France, and Ireland, and won a cap for Other Nationalities (RL) while at Rochdale Hornets in 1921 against England.

Personal history
Powell was born in Cardiff in 1892. His brother Jack Powell (born 12 August 1894 in Cardiff – died 7 February 1968 aged 73 in Llandough/Llandough, Penarth/Llandow) also played for Cardiff and was capped for Wales against Ireland in 1923, as a wing. During World War I Wick Powell served with the 38th (Welsh) Infantry Division in France, returning to Cardiff after the end of hostilities to captain Cardiff RFC in the 1919-1920 season. He changed rugby football codes from rugby union to rugby league when he transferred from Cardiff RFC to the Rochdale Hornets. After breaking his shoulder in the Rochdale Hornets's 2-16 defeat by Australia during the 1921–22 Kangaroo tour of Great Britain match at Athletic Grounds,, Rochdale on Saturday 12 November 1921, he retired from rugby league, and returned to Cardiff in 1922 where he captained Cardiff at bowls, while becoming the landlord of the Cardiff Cottage public house, St Mary Street, Cardiff and then the City Arms Hotel public house on Quay Street, Cardiff, just opposite the Cardiff Arms Park, he died, aged 68, in Cyncoed, Wales.

References

External links
Search for "Wickham Powell" at britishnewspaperarchive.co.uk
Search for "Wick Powell" at britishnewspaperarchive.co.uk

1892 births
1961 deaths
British Army personnel of World War I
Cardiff RFC players
Dual-code rugby internationals
Other Nationalities rugby league team players
Publicans
Rugby league players from Cardiff
Rugby union players from Cardiff
Rochdale Hornets players
Wales international rugby union players
Welsh bowls players
Welsh rugby league players
Welsh rugby union players